Pascale Trinquet (born 11 August 1958 in Marseille) is a French fencer and Olympic champion in foil competition.

She won a gold medal in the foil event at the 1980 Summer Olympics in Moscow. She also won a gold medal in team foil with the French team.

In an earlier event in the United States, Trinquet competed in a 1979 international invitation tournament at the New York Athletic Club, winning the women's foil with only eight touches against her while scoring 25 against her opponents.

Her elder sister Véronique Trinquet is also a former fencer and Olympic medalist. Pascale and Véronique are the daughters of a Saint-Tropez retail pharmacist, and after their sporting career was over, they owned a pharmacy in Paris 16th arrondissement.

References

External links

1958 births
Living people
Sportspeople from Marseille
French female foil fencers
Olympic fencers of France
Fencers at the 1980 Summer Olympics
Fencers at the 1984 Summer Olympics
Olympic gold medalists for France
Olympic bronze medalists for France
Olympic medalists in fencing
Medalists at the 1980 Summer Olympics
Medalists at the 1984 Summer Olympics
Universiade medalists in fencing
Universiade gold medalists for France
Medalists at the 1979 Summer Universiade